The Nikopol Trilogy is a series of three science fiction graphic novels written in French by Yugoslavian-born Enki Bilal, published between 1980 and 1992. The original French titles of the series are La Foire aux immortels (1980), La Femme piège (1986), and Froid Équateur (1992), which in 1995 were collected together in a single volume entitled . The individual stories were translated into English and published by Humanoids Publishing under the titles Gods in Chaos, The Woman Trap, and Cold Equator. In 1999, the trilogy was also published in English as a single volume, The Nikopol Trilogy. The series is regarded as one of the most original science fiction comics which have revolutionised the conventions of comic art.

The central plot of the trilogy, set in 2023 Paris, follows Alcide Nikopol who returns from a 30-year sentence spent orbiting the Earth under cryopreservation to find France under fascist rule following two nuclear wars.

The books have been adapted into the video game  Nikopol: Secrets of the Immortals, published by White Birds Productions, and a movie, entitled Immortal.

References
Notes

Bibliography

 
French graphic novels
French comic strips
Science fiction comics
Comics set in the 2020s
1980 comics debuts
1992 comics endings
French comics adapted into films
Comics adapted into video games
Comics by Enki Bilal
Comics set in Paris